In the United Kingdom statutory sick pay (SSP) is paid by an employer to all employees who are off work because of sickness for longer than 3 consecutive workdays (or 3 non-consecutive workdays falling within an 8 week period)  but less than 28 weeks and who normally pay National Insurance contributions (NICs), often referred to as earning above the Lower Earnings Limit (LEL). Days on which the employee would normally have worked  are referred to as qualifying days, the first three of these; known as waiting days are unpaid unless the employee has qualified for SSP within the previous 8 weeks and this included waiting days. Between 13 March 2020 and 25 March 2022, SSP was also paid from the first qualifying day if the employee was self isolating on medical advice relating to COVID-19. SSP is £99.35 per week for 2022/23. SSP is not paid to a number of categories of employees, including:

 Those who are paid less than the national insurance lower earnings limit - £123 for the 2022/23 tax year.
 New employees who have not done any work under contract of employment.
 Employees in receipt of Maternity Allowance or Statutory Maternity Pay (SMP)
 Employees recently in receipt of Social Security Benefits (within the last 57 days).
 Prisoners.
 Employees on strike.

If the individual is unable to work due to medical reasons for longer than 28 weeks, entitlement to SSP ceases, but the person may be entitled to Employment and Support Allowance.

Statutory basis

Section 151 of the Social Security Contributions and Benefits Act 1992 requires employers to make payments.

External links
Full text of Social Security Contributions and Benefits Act 1992 at legislation.gov.uk
Statutory Sick Pay (SSP) - Overview at Gov.uk

References

Social security in the United Kingdom